Huai Ket railway station is a railway station located in Ngiu Rai Subdistrict, Taphan Hin District, Phichit. It is located 324.915 km from Bangkok railway station and is a class 3 railway station. It is on the Northern Line of the State Railway of Thailand.

Train services
 Ordinary 201/202 Bangkok-Phitsanulok-Bangkok
 Local 401/402 Lop Buri-Phitsanulok-Lop Buri
 Local 407/408 Nakhon Sawan-Chiang Mai-Nakhon Sawan

References 
 
 

Railway stations in Thailand